The 1952–53 NBA season was the Warriors' 7th season in the NBA.

Offseason

Draft picks

Roster

Regular season

Season standings

x – clinched playoff spot

Record vs. opponents

Game log

Player statistics

Season

Awards and records
 Neil Johnston, NBA All-Star Game
 Neil Johnston, NBA Scoring Champion
 Neil Johnston, All-NBA First Team
 Andy Phillip, All-NBA Second Team

Transactions

References

See also
 1952-53 NBA season

Golden State Warriors seasons
Phil